is the name of three mountains in Gifu Prefecture, Japan. One of the mountains is on the border of Gifu and Aichi prefectures. Another mountain is on the border of Gifu and Nagano prefectures. The third mountain is located on the border of all three prefectures. All three mountains are included in this article.

Gifu and Aichi

The Mount Mikuni separating Gifu and Aichi prefectures is located in Gifu's Toki and Aichi's Toyota.

A four-story observation deck, a prefectural park and camp grounds are located on top of the mountain. There are no other tall mountains nearby, so many visitors come to the park at night because the observation deck offers a good view of the surrounding Nōbi Plain. A small road through the forest begins in the city of Toyota.

Aichi International Broadcasting Co. has antennas near the mountain peak. Other digital broadcasters also had antennas on the top of the mountain, but spillover from the competing signals caused problems. To solve the problem, a new tower was built in Seto and the signals do not interfere with each other anymore.

Coordinates:

Gifu and Nagano
The Mount Mikuni separating Gifu and Nagano prefectures is located in Gifu's Gero and Nakatsugawa and Nagano's Ōtaki, Kiso District. It received its name because it was located on the border of the former provinces of Hida, Mino and Shinano. It is also one of "Gifu's 100 Mountains." The kanji for this mountain are sometimes read as Mount Sangoku (三国山 Sangoku-san).

Coordinates:

Gifu, Aichi and Nagano

The Mount Mikuni separating the three prefectures is located in Gifu's Ena; Nagano's Neba, Shimoina District; and Aichi's Toyota.

The Aichi Prefecture side of the mountain is home to Nagoya Kōchin (名古屋コーチン), a regional breed of chicken. There is also a dirt track for car racing on the mountain. During the Miocene Epoch, the mountain was an active volcano and caused the "turtle shell stones" (亀甲岩 kikkōiwa), which are a natural treasure of the village of Neba.

Coordinates:

References

Mountains of Gifu Prefecture
Mountains of Aichi Prefecture
Mountains of Nagano Prefecture